Sibir (literally: Siberia), built in 1977, is a retired Russian nuclear-powered icebreaker of the . She is the only icebreaker of her class that does not feature a red superstructure.

She was withdrawn from service in 1992 and was reported in 2012 as being moored at Murmansk awaiting scrapping.

She has a gross tonnage of 20,655 and a dead weight of 4,096 tonnes.

References

 

Icebreakers of the Soviet Union
Icebreakers of Russia
1977 ships
Nuclear-powered icebreakers
Ships built in the Soviet Union
Ships built at the Baltic Shipyard